Chuchle battle was a student brawl fought in a Chuchle restaurant on June 29, 1881, resulting in several wounds and a general hangover, a swatch of Czech and German chauvinism in the late 19th century, just before the Charles-Ferdinand University was divided into  Czech Charles-Ferdinand University and German Charles-Ferdinand University part in 1882.

Bibliography
 Josef Neuwirth: Blutige Krawalle. In: Bohemia (Prager Tageszeitung), 29 June 1881 (reprinted in Wolfgang Wolfram von Wolmar: Prag und das Reich. Dresden 1943, pp. 314 ff.)
 Egon Erwin Kisch: Die Kuchelbader Schlacht. In: Prager Tagblatt, 8 June 1930
 Egon Erwin Kisch: Die Kuchelbader Schlacht. In: Prager Pitaval. Späte Reportagen. Berlin / Weimar 1969, 5th edn 1992, pp. 267–271
 Julius Kraus: Prag. 1908 (novel)
 Jürgen Herrlein: Die "Kuchelbader Schlacht" des Jahres 1881 aus der Sicht der akademischen Untersuchungsbehörde der Universität Prag, in: Kai-Oliver Knops/ Heinz Georg Bamberger/ Gerrit Hölzle (eds.): Zivilrecht im Wandel, Festschrift für Peter Derleder zum 75. Geburtstag, Springer-Verlag Berlin Heidelberg 2015, pp. 189–210

1881 in Europe
19th century in Prague